Interstate 283 (I-283) is an auxiliary route of the Interstate Highway System located just east of Harrisburg, Pennsylvania. It travels from the Harrisburg East interchange of I-76 (Pennsylvania Turnpike) north to I-83/U.S. Route 322 (US 322, Capital Beltway) at the Eisenhower Interchange. Pennsylvania Route 283 (PA 283, officially designated as SR 300 because of I-283) continues southeast from near the southern terminus of I-283 to Lancaster as a freeway, functioning as an extension of the Interstate, though they are two separate roads.

Route description

I-283 begins at the Harrisburg East interchange of I-76 (Pennsylvania Turnpike) in Lower Swatara Township, Dauphin County; this interchange is a trumpet interchange. Past the interchange tollbooth, the road continues north and immediately reaches a partial cloverleaf interchange with the PA 283 freeway that also has access to PA 230 via Eisenhower Boulevard. I-283 continues north-northwest as a four-lane freeway, running past business parks before entering areas of farms and woods, crossing into Swatara Township. The road enters commercial areas as it comes to a diamond interchange with PA 441. After that exit, the road continues northwest before turning north and passing an industrial park. I-283 comes to its northern terminus at the Eisenhower Interchange with I-83/US 322 (Capital Beltway), at which point the freeway continues north as part of I-83 northbound/US 322 westbound along the Capital Beltway while I-83 southbound heads west along the Capital Beltway and US 322 eastbound heads east on a freeway.

History

Construction began on the Interstate in 1968. Previously, the Harrisburg East interchange of the Pennsylvania Turnpike connected directly to Eisenhower Boulevard. The section from the turnpike to PA 441 opened in 1970 and included a short portion of what is now PA 283, connecting Eisenhower Boulevard to the exit 1 cloverleaf. The next year, the Eisenhower Interchange opened to traffic along with the remaining section of Interstate.

As part of a project to reconstruct  of PA 283, the interchange between I-283 and PA 283 is being improved. The ramp from westbound PA 283 and northbound I-283 is being widened to two lanes, and the loop ramp from westbound PA 283 to southbound I-283 toward the Pennsylvania Turnpike toll plaza will be removed and replaced with a left turn and a traffic signal. This will eliminate the problem of traffic weaving between the aforementioned loop ramp and the heavily-traveled loop ramp from southbound I-283 to eastbound PA 283. The project is projected to be completed in late 2020.

Exit list

See also

References

External links

 I-283 on Kurumi.com
 Interstate Guide - I-283
 Pennsylvania Highways: I-283
 I-283 at AARoads.com

83-2
83-2
Roads in the Harrisburg, Pennsylvania area
Transportation in Dauphin County, Pennsylvania
2